

Co-ownership resolve

References
general
https://web.archive.org/web/20070706141738/http://www.lega-calcio.it/comun/0607/partecipazioni2007-2008.pdf
https://web.archive.org/web/20070706141738/http://www.lega-calcio.it/comun/0607/buste07_08.pdf
specific

I
Tran
2007